The 2011 Kilkenny Intermediate Hurling Championship was the 47th staging of the Kilkenny Intermediate Hurling Championship since its establishment by the Kilkenny County Board in 1929. The championship began on 17 September 2011 and ended on 16 October 2011.

On 16 October 2011, Danesfort won the championship after a 2–11 to 0–11 victory over Rower-Inistioge in the final at Nowlan Park. It was their second title overall and their first title since 1931.

Glenmore's Eoin Murphy was the championship's top scorer with 1-24.

Results

First round

Relegation play-off

Quarter-finals

Semi-finals

Final

Championship statistics

Top scorers

Top scorers overall

Top scorers in a single game

References

Kilkenny Intermediate Hurling Championship
Kilkenny Intermediate Hurling Championship